La Bosse-de-Bretagne (Gallo: La Bocz) is a commune in the Ille-et-Vilaine department in Brittany in northwestern France.

Geography
The river Semnon forms most of the commune's southern border.

Population

Inhabitants of La Bosse-de-Bretagne are called Bosséens in French.

See also
Communes of the Ille-et-Vilaine department

References

External links

Mayors of Ille-et-Vilaine Association 

Communes of Ille-et-Vilaine